The seventh season of Fear the Walking Dead, an American horror-drama television series on AMC, premiered on October 17, 2021, and concluded on June 5, 2022, consisting of sixteen episodes. The series is a companion series to The Walking Dead, which is based on the comic book series of the same name by Robert Kirkman, Tony Moore, and Charlie Adlard. The executive producers are Kirkman, David Alpert, Greg Nicotero, Gale Anne Hurd, Scott M. Gimple, Andrew Chambliss, and Ian B. Goldberg, with Chambliss and Goldberg as showrunners for the fourth consecutive season.

The season follows Morgan's group scattered across the landscape of Texas as they try to survive the nuclear fallout brought about by Teddy (John Glover) and his followers. Meanwhile, Morgan Jones (Lennie James) and Victor Strand (Colman Domingo) clash over their philosophies.

Cast
The seventh season featured thirteen actors receiving main cast billing status, with all of them returning from the sixth season. This was the first season not to include Maggie Grace, Garret Dillahunt and Zoe Colletti, who were all credited as main cast members in previous seasons; however, Grace appears in a guest role.

Main cast

 Lennie James as Morgan Jones: A pragmatic man, formerly a part of Rick Grimes' group on The Walking Dead. He is currently in a relationship with Grace and the adoptive father of Isaac and Rachel's daughter, Morgan.
 Alycia Debnam-Carey as Alicia Clark: The fiery yet compassionate daughter of Madison. She is currently the leader of a group of survivors living underneath the Franklin Hotel's bunker, where she was imprisoned by Teddy in the previous season.
 Colman Domingo as Victor Strand: A smart and sophisticated conman-turned-businessman, who formed friendships with Madison and Alicia. He is currently the totalitarian leader of a new thriving safe-zone, the Tower, and the season's primary antagonist.
 Danay García as Luciana Galvez: A strong and cautious former member of the La Colonia community in Tijuana, Mexico. She was among the survivors whom Althea and Isabelle saved from the nuclear blast.
 Austin Amelio as Dwight: A reformed former lieutenant of the Saviors, who was exiled from Virginia by Rick Grimes' group on The Walking Dead. He eventually reunited with his wife Sherry and is now a member of the ethical outlaws known as the Dark Horses.
 Mo Collins as Sarah Rabinowitz: The adoptive sister of Wendell and a former Marine. She was among the survivors whom Althea and Isabelle saved from the nuclear blast.
 Alexa Nisenson as Charlie: A young girl who was a spy for the Vultures. She was among the survivors whom Althea and Isabelle saved from the nuclear blast.
 Karen David as Grace Mukherjee: A woman who used to work at a nuclear power plant that melted down near the site where the plane of Morgan's group crashed. She is currently in a relationship with Morgan Jones and the adoptive mother of Isaac and Rachel's daughter, Morgan.
 Christine Evangelista as Sherry: Dwight's wife who fled across the country to Texas after escaping the Saviors. She eventually reunited with her husband and is now also a member of the ethical outlaws known as the Dark Horses.
 Colby Hollman as Wes: A nihilistic painter who allies with Morgan's group. He was among the survivors whom Althea and Isabelle saved from the nuclear blast.
 Jenna Elfman as June Dorie: A kind nurse who was married to John. She is currently hiding from the nuclear blast and living in Teddy's bunker along with her father-in-law, John Dorie Sr.
 Keith Carradine as John Dorie Sr.: John's father who was also a police officer before the apocalypse. He is currently hiding from the nuclear blast and living in Teddy's bunker along with his daughter-in-law, June.
 Rubén Blades as Daniel Salazar: A courageous and ruthlessly pragmatic former Sombra Negra member who formed a parental bond with Charlie. He was among the survivors whom Althea and Isabelle saved from the nuclear blast.

Supporting cast
 Omid Abtahi as Howard: A former history teacher who Strand met when he was hiding from the nuclear blast. He is currently Strand's right-hand man and the deputy leader of a new thriving community, the Tower.
 Demetrius Grosse as Josiah LaRoux: Emile's twin brother who is seeking revenge upon Morgan Jones for killing his brother in the previous season.
 Maggie Grace as Althea "Al" Szewczyk-Przygocki: A curious and tactical journalist who saved most of the members of Morgan's group from the nuclear blast with the help of her lover, Isabelle.
 Daryl Mitchell as Wendell: The adoptive brother of Sarah who uses a wheelchair.
 Peter Jacobson as Jacob Kessner: A rabbi who joins Morgan's group.
 Spenser Granese as Arnold: The leader of the Stalkers who was a former member of Teddy's doomsday cult.

Guest cast
 Gus Halper as Will: The former aide of a democratic senator who lived underneath the Franklin Hotel's bunker where he met Alicia.
 Derek Richardson as Fred: A delusional survivor who is suffering from radiation sickness.
 Maren Lord as Bea: Fred's wife who is also suffering from radiation sickness.
 Aisha Tyler as Mickey: A former professional wrestler who joins forces with the Dark Horses after the death of her husband, Cliff.
 Sydney Lemmon as Isabelle: A former CRM pilot who Al befriended and who later rescued several of Morgan's friends from the coming nuclear destruction.
 Warren Snipe as Paul: A deaf musician who encounters Alicia.
 Kim Dickens as Madison Clark: A cunning and domineering high school guidance counselor, and mother of Nick and Alicia. She was presumed to be dead in the fourth season.
 Lyndon Smith as Ava Sanderson: A hardened survivor from Louisiana whose daughter got kidnapped by a mysterious organization.

Episodes

Production
On December 3, 2020, the series was renewed for a seventh season.

Casting
In July 2021, it was announced that Sydney Lemmon would return to the series as Isabelle. Lemmon last appeared in the show's fifth season, and made a voice-only appearance in the sixth season. In September 2021, Aisha Tyler was confirmed to have joined the cast in an unknown role. Tyler previously directed an episode in the sixth season. In December 2021, it was reported that Kim Dickens would reprise her role as Madison Clark this season, and continue as a series regular in the eighth season. The seventh season is the final one to feature Alycia Debnam-Carey, as she confirmed her exit from the series after the broadcast of the fifteenth episode of the season, stating, "I decided it was time for me to move on as an actor and as a person."

Filming and writing
Production began in April 2021 in Texas, and ended in December 2021. Cast members Lennie James and Alycia Debnam-Carey each directed episodes in the seventh season; James previously directed an episode in the prior season and Debnam-Carey made her directorial debut this season. 

Showrunner Ian Goldberg described the seventh season as a "nuclear zombie apocalypse western story", stating:

Release
The season premiered on October 17, 2021, on AMC, with each episode available a week early via AMC+.

Ratings

References

External links
 
 

2021 American television seasons
2022 American television seasons
07